Talyllyn is a narrow gauge steam locomotive. It was built by Fletcher, Jennings & Co. in 1864 and is one of the oldest locomotives still in active service. It was delivered to the Talyllyn Railway on 24 September 1864 and continues to run on this railway.

History 

The Talyllyn Railway ordered two locomotives for its opening in 1865, Talyllyn and Dolgoch. Both were built by Fletcher, Jennings & Co. of Whitehaven, although to two very different designs. Talyllyn was the first order the company had delivered to north Wales and the first narrow gauge locomotive they had built with plate frames.

Early tests on the railway showed that this wheel arrangement led to unacceptable vertical oscillation, and in January 1867, Talyllyn was returned to its manufacturer for the fitting of a pair of trailing wheels, converting it into an 0-4-2ST. A cab was subsequently fitted in the railway's workshops at Pendre.

One unusual feature of the conversion of Talyllyn to an 0-4-2 wheel arrangement is that the trailing axle was fixed rigidly to the frame, resulting in an overall wheelbase of 8 ft. Most 0-4-2 locomotives have trailing wheels that are able to swivel independently of the frame, thus avoiding creating a long fixed wheelbase. To accommodate Talyllyn'''s long wheelbase, the gauge of the Talyllyn Railway was increased marginally to between 2 ft 3½in and 2 ft 4in.

The locomotive was returned to Fletcher Jennings for a second time around 1900, although the reason for this visit is not recorded. Repairs and improvements were also made at Pendre over the years, including alterations to the cab, fitting of a footplate at the front of locomotive and of a sandbox. A new set of frames supplied by W.G. Bagnall's was also fitted at Pendre, again around 1900.Talyllyn remained in service for most of the life of the original railway. By the time of the Second World War it had fallen into a very poor state of repair, as it was the more popular of the two locomotives and was used more frequently. It was retired in 1945, when its boiler and firebox were found to be beyond use or further repair. At that time the locomotive was still carrying its original 1864 boiler.

 Preservation 

Following the rescue of the Talyllyn Railway in 1951, Talyllyn was inspected and found to be beyond economic repair. However, as the railway's fortunes improved, it became possible to consider a major overhaul. In 1957 the locomotive was sent away to the Gibbons Brothers' Brierley Hill engineering works at Lenches Bridge in Pensnett for a complete renewal. A new boiler, saddletank and bunker were built and Talyllyn returned to service in 1958.

 In fiction Talyllyn, along with Dolgoch, appeared many times in The Railway Series books by Wilbert Awdry, and the Thomas & Friends TV show, in which it formed the basis for the character Skarloey''.

References 

Talyllyn Railway locomotives
Individual locomotives of Great Britain
Preserved narrow gauge steam locomotives of Great Britain
0-4-2ST locomotives
Railway locomotives introduced in 1864
Fletcher, Jennings locomotives